Dinara Nature Park is the twelfth nature park in Croatia. The area is 63,052 hectares (630.52 km2), and it is located in the area of Split-Dalmatia County and Šibenik-Knin County. It is the second largest Croatian nature park (the largest is the Velebit Nature Park).

Territory

On 22 May 2020, a public presentation was held in Knin as part of the public review of the Law on the Proclamation of the "Dinara" Nature Park. The presentation was attended by the Minister of Environmental Protection and Energy Tomislav Ćorić, Šibenik-Knin County Prefect Goran Pauk, Split-Dalmatia county Prefect Blaženko Boban, Knin Mayor Marko Jelić, as well as citizens, representatives of non-governmental organizations and other interested public.

Biodiversity

Dinaric karst is an internationally recognized phenomenon that covers a much wider area, and it was named after Dinara as the type locality. It is the largest natural body of karst in the world, with deposits eight kilometers thick and with highly developed karst fields that contain all karst phenomena.

The Dinara area is extremely rich in endemic and endangered species. It is home to more than 1,000 plant species (a fifth of the total Croatian flora), of which 75 are national endemics. More than 20 endemic animal species are known, including one mammal – the Dinaric vole. On Dinara is the highest peak of the Republic of Croatia – Dinara, also known as Sinjal (1831 meters). On the territory of the Dinara Nature Park there are 11 areas of the ecological network (2 areas for birds and 9 for species and habitats), so that 87% of the area of the Nature Park "Dinara" is also the area of the ecological network Natura 2000. The high Dinaric grasslands (rudina) are the most important habitat of the endemic mountain viper (Vipera ursinii macrops) in Croatia.

See also 
List of mountains in Croatia

References

External links

Nature parks of Croatia
Dinaric Alps
Split-Dalmatia County